Phyllothelys is a genus of Asian praying mantids in the family Hymenopodidae: subfamily Phyllothelyinae.

Species
The Mantodea Species File lists:
 Phyllothelys bakeri Werner, 1922
 Phyllothelys breve Wang, 1993
 Phyllothelys cornutus Zhang, 1988
 Phyllothelys decipiens Giglio-Tos, 1915
 Phyllothelys hepaticus Zhang, 1988
 Phyllothelys jianfenglingensis Hua, 1984
 Phyllothelys mitratum Rehn, 1904
 Phyllothelys paradoxum Wood-Mason, 1885
 Phyllothelys robusta Niu & Liu, 1998
 Phyllothelys sinensis Ouchi, 1938
 Phyllothelys taprobanae Wood-Mason, 1889
 Phyllothelys werneri Karny, 1915
 Phyllothelys westwoodi Wood-Mason, 1876 - type species

References

External links
Image at iNatutalist

Mantodea genera
Insects of Southeast Asia